The Schütte-Lanz C.I was a German reconnaissance aircraft prototype of World War I.

Design
The aircraft was a double wooden biplane equipped with a 160 hp Mercedes D.III engine. The observer was in the bow cabin, which provided a good overview and was armed with a 7.92-mm Parabellum machine gun on a movable turret.

Development
The C.I was the first airplane built by Schutte-Lanz, which had specialized in airship construction. The prototype made its first flight in 1915, but the aircraft did not enter production.

Specifications

References

Further reading

1910s German military reconnaissance aircraft
C.I
Aircraft first flown in 1915